George Thomas was an Indian cricketer who played first-class cricket for Madras from 1962 to 1969.

Playing career
George Thomas was a prominent schoolboy cricketer who represented Madras Schools and South Zone Schools in the national Cooch Behar Trophy in 1957–58, 1958–59 and 1959–60. At first he played as an opening bowler, but in his final season, when South Zone Schools won the trophy, he played as an opening batsman and wicket-keeper.

He made his first-class debut as a fast bowler and tail-end batsman for Madras in 1962–63 against Kerala in the Ranji Trophy. He took the wicket of the first opening batsman in each innings, and Madras won by an innings, but he was no-balled for throwing. He took one wicket in the next match, which was ruined by rain, and was then omitted. Thomas returned to the team in 1963-64 and opened the bowling in all three of Madras's matches, taking five wickets at an average of 33.80 in an attack based on spinners led by V. V. Kumar.

He played the first match in 1964–65, taking one wicket, and was left out of the team for the next two matches. He returned for the last match, against Andhra, and took 4 for 30 and 2 for 41 in an innings victory.

He seldom played thereafter, but returned for the Gopalan Trophy match in 1968–69, making his highest score, 22, and taking 4 for 58, including the wickets of Anura Tennekoon (leg-before) and David Heyn (bowled). His last match came in 1969–70, when, for his last wicket, he bowled the Andhra opening batsman before a run had been scored in the match.

He was one of the early players for the Jolly Rovers cricket club in Chennai, which began in 1966.

Notes

References

External links
 George Thomas at CricketArchive
 George Thomas at Cricinfo

1940s births
Year of death uncertain
Indian cricketers
Tamil Nadu cricketers